Alton is an unincorporated community in Lafayette County, Florida, United States.  Its elevation is 82 feet (25 m), and it is located at  (30.053,-83.138).

References

Unincorporated communities in Lafayette County, Florida
Unincorporated communities in Florida